Nanarup Beach is a beach in the Great Southern region of Western Australia,  east of Albany.

The beach is white sand and has stairway access at the western end where Taylor Inlet discharges into the ocean. Toilets, a picnic area and a former caravan park are also situated near the western end of the beach. Four-wheel drive vehicles are permitted on the beach and can drive towards Two Peoples Bay.

The beach is not patrolled by surf lifesavers and can be dangerous due to the presence of many rips along the beach. A man drowned at Nanarup in 2013 after being swept off the rocks while fishing. The area is especially popular for surfing and fishing.

Approximately  in length, Nanarup has scattered beachrock reefs at the eastern end for a distance of about  then curves to the southwest; the remaining length is a wave dominated surf zone that extends as far as the inlet. The beach is mostly backed by scarped  calcarenite bluffs to the east and unstable dunes to the west.

The far western end of the beach has the  granite boulders of Islet Point connected to the shore by a small tombolo, which forms a sheltered pool area that is suitable for safe swimming.

References

Beaches of Western Australia
Surfing locations in Western Australia
Great Southern (Western Australia)
South coast of Western Australia